is a Japanese playwright, director, and academic. For the majority of his life, he has been best known for his work in theater and creating what he has coined, “contemporary colloquial theater,” or as theater critics call it, “quiet drama.”

Career
Oriza Hirata graduated from International Christian University as a part of their Humanities division. In 1983, he formed the Seinendan Theater Company, which he established in order to practice contemporary colloquial theater. In 1984, Seinendan settled into using the Komaba Agora Theater as their main base of operations. Hirata remains as the theater's primary artistic director and has continued to play a major role in the theater's management.

Hirata's first play, first premiered in 1989, and has remained one of his most famous plays. 6 Years later, in 1994, he debuted , which is still considered his magnum opus. As a playwright, Hirata has continued to write and direct plays both at Komaba Agora theater, as well as theaters in Europe, the Americas, and other parts of Asia. He is also known for doing international collaborations both in Japan and all around the world, where he has worked with a multitude of playwrights and artists to introduce his own work to new audiences, as well as introduce foreign work to Japan.

Hirata worked at Obirin University for six years as a professor in their theater department before moving onto Osaka University, where he works in their communication-design and robotics departments.

Contemporary colloquial theater

Contemporary colloquial theater is a theatrical style Oriza Hirata founded as an answer to the “boisterous and festive nature of 1980s Japanese theater.” This style emphasizes colloquial Japanese language use that is designed to sound distinctly typical of the linguistic tendencies and patterns of everyday Japanese speaking. As a result, his plays oftentimes feature multiple characters talking at once, sentence fragments, inaudible speech, and an understated, "normal" speaking tone. This style informs his plays stylistically, both in language and plot, in the sense that Hirata emphasizes realism throughout. However, Hirata has preferred his own stylistic title of "contemporary colloquial theater" because he thinks that relatable terms like Shingeki or realism "sounded too much like the Western drama that [they] emulated." 
Hirata's style is partially due to his identification the impact of Western style was having on Japanese arts. As a reaction, he has sought to create an artistic style more representative of typical Japanese language and culture. As a playwright, he founded the Seinendan theater company in 1983 as a way to push his acting style into the greater Japanese and international theatre scenes.
Hirata has worked closely with international actors when translating his work to preserve the Japanese identity of the speech, which has particularly resonated with French audiences. This style also tends to emphasize a small, intimate set of characters—usually represented by the actors playing the role of a family—to serve as a “microcosm of Japanese society as a whole.”  Japanese theater scholar, M. Cody Poulton, describes Hirata's style as an emphasis of the Greek idea of ethos, "the prevalent tone of sentiment of a people or community; the genius of an institution or system."

Interdisciplinary work

After working at Obirin University as a theater professor, Oriza Hirata moved to work for Osaka University, where he collaborated in the scientific fields of communication-design and robotics.

Hirata has participated in designing university classes that emphasize the communication environment for different fields in order for them to perform more successfully.

For robotics, Hirata used his theater experience to attempt to make robots that act similarly to humans. While his work has been used to generally fulfill this role, he has also brought his work in robotics back to the theater, where he has incorporated robots in plays to explore themes of humanity. His play, I, Worker uses two robots as main characters to explore this very idea. He has collaborated with robotics expert Hiroshi Ishiguro for his theatrical experiments using robots.

International work and acclaim

Shortly after beginning his career as a playwright, Oriza Hirata has had a prolific international career—both touring his work around the world, as well as staging foreign playwrights work at his own theater in Japan.

Beginning in the early 2000s, Hirata's work started to garner international attention. With the help of Japan's Saison Foundation, a grant-making foundation that supports Japanese Theater, and Manhattan's Nonprofit organization Japan Society, Hirata's most famous work, Tōkyō Notes was debuted in the United States in October 2000 in New York City. Japan Society's theater series, Japanese Theatre NOW, has helped bring a number of contemporary Japanese dramas to the United States, Hirata's being notable since Tōkyō Notes was one of the first.

Since then, Hirata's work and company have traveled much of the world, including France, Belgium, Switzerland, Ireland, Germany, the United Kingdom, Korea, China, Australia, and Brazil. Hirata says that he believes he has "done the best work in France," where "the people in France have been very enthusiastic about [his] work." Both in France and Belgium, Hirata has collaborated with international actors and directors to bring his theatrical work to an international audience, as well as creating new commissioned work as both a playwright and director.

Hirata has also collaborated on many international works inside of Japan, using his theater to stage plays by playwrights from France, Switzerland, Italy, Spain, the United States, Korea, and China. Hirata's admiration for the French theater scene can be seen with these collaborations as well, as he has tended to stage more French plays than any other country he has collaborated with.

A year after the Fukushima Daiichi nuclear disaster, Hirata submitted a 10-minute play, along with 18 other American and Japanese artist, to be performed and documented in an event called Shinsai: Theaters For Japan. The event happened that the Great Hall at Cooper Union in New York City. Hirata's play, entitled "Sayonara II", tells the story of a partially-broken robot who is asked to read poems to the people who died after the disaster.

Accolades

39th Kishida Prize for Drama for his play Tōkyō Notes  (1995).
5th Yomiuru Theater Outstanding Director Award for producing Masataka Matsuda's play The Cape of the Moon (1998).
9th Yomiuri Theater Award for Outstanding Production on his play Attacking Ueno Zoo for the Fourth Time (2002).
Association Internationale des Critiques des Théâtre Critique Award for his book Arts as the Basis of a Nation (2002).
Winner of the Grand Prix of the 2nd Asahi Performing Arts Awards for his play Across the River in May (2003).
Montblanc de la Culture Arts Patronage Award (2006).

List of works

Major works
1989: : One of Hirata's earliest and most critically acclaimed works, Citizens of Seoul tackles Japan's superiority complex over Korea during their colonization.
1994: : Hirata's most famous and praised work around the world, Tōkyō Notes takes place in a museum where a number of people's personal lives are examined in order to gain a fuller picture of the political, social, and cultural context of a near-future Japan.
2002: : Summarizing the world's history post-WWII, this is one of Hiraza's most grand dramas in terms of scope. Winston Churchill, Franklin D. Roosevelt, and Joseph Stalin are the only 3 characters in the play.

Recent works
2009: 
2009: 
2009: 
2008: 
2008: 
2008: 
2008: 
2007: 
2007:

Other notable works
2005: 
2005: 
2003: 
2003: 
2002: 
2001: 
2000: 
2000: 
1999: 
1999: 
1999: 
1999: 
1998: 
1997: 
1997: 
1997: 
1997: 
1996: 
1996: 
1996: 
1995: 
1994: 
1994: 
1992: 
1992: 
1992: 
1992: 
1991: 
1991: 
1991: 
1990: 
1990:

External links
 Seinendan

References

1962 births
Living people
Japanese directors
Academic staff of Osaka University
20th-century Japanese dramatists and playwrights
21st-century Japanese dramatists and playwrights
International Christian University alumni
Academic staff of J. F. Oberlin University